Ministry for Internal Affairs of the Republic of Karelia (Министерство внутренних дел по Республике Карелия) is the main law enforcement organ in the Republic of Karelia in Russia. Subordinated directly to the Russian Interior Ministry and the President of Karelia.

The MVD of Karelia is the territorial policing body in the Russian Karelia.

According to the new law "On the Police" ("О полиции") from February 7, 2011 and in the internal issue of theFederal MVD from April 27, 2011.

The Main tasks are:
 Secure the Life, Rights, the freedom of the Citizen of Russia
 fighting against crimes, secure the public order in the Republic of Karelia

History
September 5, 1923 - The Ministry for Internal Affairs of the Republic of Karelia
July 3, 1936 - The local Traffic Police was established
March 16, 1937 - Establishment of the Unit for Economic crimes of the Karelia's Internal Ministry
 April 6, 1963 - The Investigations Department was formed
May 19, 1969 - Unit for Special Training of the Spetsnaz
June 14, 1992 - The local Migratory Service was formed
August 7, 2001 - Formation of the Information and Operative Department of the Criminal Militsiya

Politics of the Republic of Karelia
Karelia
Karelia